"Devil's Reign" is an American comic book event written by Chip Zdarsky with art by Marco Checchetto, published from 2021 to 2022 by Marvel Comics.

Premise
In a ploy to increase his power, Mayor Wilson Fisk has outlawed superheroes in New York City.

Plot
Mayor Wilson Fisk discovers physical evidence proving that he once knew Daredevil's true identity, noticing gaps in his own memory after the fact. Outraged, Mayor Fisk confronts Daredevil, who taunts him. Consequentially, Mayor Fisk outlaws vigilantism in the city.
To enforce his new law, Mayor Fisk sets up Thunderbolts units. Moon Knight, Danny Rand, Reed Richards, and Sue Storm are apprehended by members of the Thunderbolts and incarcerated in the Myrmidon. Luke Cage speaks out against Mayor Fisk while being filmed by onlookers. Fisk visits a captured Purple Man, cutting off the latter's finger to create a staff with mind-controlling abilities. At their estate, the elite Stromwyns plan to have Fisk run for President.

The remaining heroes gather at Avengers Mansion, where Tony Stark announces he plans to run for mayor opposite Fisk. The other heroes decide that Cage is a better candidate, angering Stark. At City Hall, Fisk and Doctor Octopus discuss their plans to sway the populace of New York into reelecting Fisk by amplifying the Purple Man's powers. Doc Ock then uses Reed Richards's inter-dimensional to alternate-universe Octopus versions of Hulk, Ghost Rider, and Wolverine, considering his plans "Superior". Meanwhile, Taskmaster fights Spider-Man, leaving the latter severely injured.

Spider-Man is then brought to the police station, where he is rescued by the Thing and Human Torch. Luke Cage holds a rally to announce his mayoral campaign. At the Myrmidon, Sue Storm is discusses the situation with her lawyer, Kirsten McDuffie, who gives Sue a paperclip. Fisk discusses his plans with the Purple Man, who notes that the Purple Children were the ones who erased their memories of Daredevil's identity. Jessica Jones realizes that Fisk is using the Purple Man to influence the city, prompting the Avengers to act immediately. They are intercepted by Doctor Octopus and his alternate selves; Stark is revealed to be the Chameleon in disguise and in league with Doc Ock while Foggy Nelson is attacked in his office by Fisk's men.

Two weeks later, Doctor Octopus has released thousands of Octobot drones in order to enforce Mayor Wilson Fisk's zero-tolerance policy, effectively wiping out all crime in the city. Daredevil visits Nelson, who is recovering in the hospital. Storm uses the paperclip to remove her power-dampening collar, meeting with Reed Richards and breaking out of the Myrmidon with the other jailed heroes. The Champions battle Rhino, who saves the team from incoming Octobots. He explains that Fisk ordered the Thunderbolts to hunt down a group of children, who Miles Morales identifies as the Purple Children. Fisk discovers that his staff can restore memories, and uses it on himself, rediscovering Daredevil's secret identity of Matt Murdock.

As the Purple Children are apprehended by the Thunderbolts, Jessica arrives with the Champions in an attempt to rescue them. They are driven away by Abomination, but are able to rescue one of the Purple Children, Joseph. The remaining Purple Children's' powers are given to their father in order to increase his power. Fisk then orders the Purple Man to kill the superheroes. While Spider-Man works on reverse-engineering neural disruptors in order to protect the heroes from the Purple Man, Joseph tells them that their only option to stop him is to kill him. The Avengers then go out to search for the Purple Man, before discovering that he has taken control of the Thunderbolts and the general populace. Meanwhile, Fisk beats Matt's identical twin Mike Murdock to death, mistaking him for Matt as McDuffie watches.

McDuffie informs Daredevil of "Matt's" death, causing him to leave the main battle and hunt down Fisk, who is confronted by Elektra. Daredevil arrives, angering Fisk. The real Iron Man, Moon Knight, and the Fantastic Four arrive at the battle, while Joseph seeks out the Purple Man. Luke Cage gives his neural disruptor to Joseph, who attempts to counter the Purple Man. Cage is able to fight off the Purple Man's control and encourage Joseph, who defeats his father and is reunited with his siblings. At the same time, Daredevil uses Fisk's staff, forcing Fisk to hesitate while Daredevil subdues him. Daredevil then attempts to kill Fisk, but is stopped by Elektra who asks him what kind of symbol he wants to be. They leave Fisk to the authorities, automatically making Cage the new mayor. Fisk is taken to the Stromwyns, choosing to refuse their offer and fighting through their robots, leaving the role of Kingpin to his son, Butch Pharris.

One week later, Daredevil discusses the idea of finally taking down the Hand with Elektra now that he no longer has to worry about his civilian identity. Fisk and his wife, Mary, go sailing into the sunset together.

Subplots

Daredevil: Woman Without Fear
After her visit to Mayor Wilson Fisk, Elektra in her Daredevil attire meets up with Matt Murdock where he learns about her visit. After making out with Matt while recalling her training with Stick, meeting Aka of the Hand, and training with the Hand where she finished off one Hand ninja with one of her sais, Elektra has coffee with Robert 'Goldy' Goldman as she sees Aka in the streets. Upon making it to the forest, Elektra in her Daredevil attire encounters Aka as jumps off a cliff. Back on the road, Elektra swerves off the road due to a deer appearing on the road. After recovering, Elektra finds a dart in one of the tires, puts on her mask, and goes hunting for what appears to be Aka only to avoid a trap. She finds the culprit responsible in the form of Kraven the Hunter who is looking for a challenge.

Kraven mentions that he is looking for a challenge and wants to take on Elektra who holds the title of "World's Deadliest Assassin". As Elektra states to Kraven that he is being used, Kraven states that he knows that she took her file from Mayor Wilson Fisk and it will benefit them both. Kraven mentions how Mayor Fisk told him about how Elektra betrayed Daredevil once and was associated with the Hand. After Kraven intercepts one of Elektra's attacks, the police arrive responding to the car accident. Kraven the Hunter flees to obtain something golden to keep up his insurance policy while Elektra subdues the police and makes off in their police car. After a flashback with Aka, Elektra finds that Kraven got to Goldy as she is attacked by the Thunderbolts unit. After fighting them off, Elektra catches up to Kraven and Goldy as Aka is shown watching from the rooftops. When the Thunderbolts agents catches up, Kraven quotes to Elektra that Mayor Fisk also gave him the law.

Elektra engages Kraven in battle as Goldy and the Thunderbolts agents stand back. When Kraven manages to punch Elektra, Goldy throws a snowball at him as the Thunderbolts agents restrain him. Elektra manages to kick Kraven before entering a school. He pursues Elektra and is defeated by her as Aka appears noting that Elektra is still trying to recruit Matt Murdock. Aka then disappears as Elektra notices that the Thunderbolts agents are clearing the school. Borrowing a jacket from a student, Elektra meets up with Goldy who states that Matt Murdock was killed in his apartment. She vows to make Mayor Fisk pay for this as Goldy notes that it's always part of the plan.

Devil's Reign: Superior Four
Doctor Octopus has formed the Superior Four with his Multiverse counterparts in the form of Hulk of Earth-8816 (whose real identity is Otto Banner), Ghost Rider of Earth-1666 (whose real identity is Otto Blaze), and Wolverine of Earth-9712 (whose real identity is Otto Howlett). He mentions that he has gone through an evolution after his tenure as Superior Spider-Man and that he plans to span the Multiverse and establish a Council of Ocks from every version of Doctor Octopus he can find. The other three Ottos claim that the result can cause a paradox as Doctor Octopus claims that they are a fixed variant like the ones for Spider-Man, Iron Man, and Doctor Strange. Doctor Octopus takes his Superior Four to Earth-5069 where they encounter Iron Scab who demands that they leave his universe. The Superior Four do away with Iron Scab. Doctor Octopus' tentacles failing to work causes the Superior Four to flee Earth-5069. Back on Earth-616, Otto Blaze claims to Doctor Octopus that magic was responsible with Doctor Octopus forgetting his deal with Mephisto. As Doctor Octopus continues his research in order to find a better solution, Otto Banner, Otto Blaze, and Otto Howlett talk about how their fates will intertwine with the other Ottos. Doctor Octopus and Otto Banner state that they should get some insight on their Multiverse counterparts. Doctor Octopus then states that out of the 3,409 variants of himself, there is one out of all realities that knows how to defeat the Superior Four. Arriving on Earth-2902, the Superior Four arrive in its forested city area and cause a disturbance to draw out Doctor Octopus' variant in this reality. They encounter a variant of Otto in recolored Spider-Man-like attire named TJ. He operates as Spider-Ock and is familiar with Earth-616 and the history of each of his variants. They beat him badly as Spider-Ock states that they had tormented pasts while his father died. Doctor Octopus uses a synthetic blood-parasite from Earth-5069 on Spider-Ock to claim his knowledge enough to disintegrate him. Doctor Octopus tells the rest of the Superior Four that they got a several thousand to go. On Earth-7214, Doctor Octopus leads the Superior Four in attacking its Atlantis where they encounter Supreme Octopus.

There are views of different versions of Otto Octavius who were died. One died of an accident that Norman Osborn covered up. One was beheaded by a laser from President MODOK. One was addicted to gamma radiation where his brain failed at puberty. One got lost in the forest and was found eaten by a wolf. This was viewed by Supreme Octopus who is tasked with keeping his counterparts in line. At the Baxter Building, Doctor Octopus gazes into the different parts of the Multiverse when he is contacted by Supreme Octopus to cease and desist. Hulk of Earth-8816 interrupts Doctor Octopus as he, Ghost Rider of Earth-1666, and Wolverine of Earth-9712 argue with him about the paradox that Doctor Octopus caused. The portal suddenly sucks the Superior Four to Earth-7212 where some type of mass-extinction event occurred due to sulfur being in the air. A tsunami then occurs as the Superior Four are caught in it. Ghost Rider of Earth-1666 claims that the Multiverse is seeking atonement for the Superior Four's meddling. Doctor Octopus is then teleported to the Savage Land on Earth-8969 where he is ensnared by Supreme Octopus who considers himself superior to Doctor Octopus where he mentioned that he liquefied Shuma-Gorath, made Dormammu grovel, and burned Knull to ashes. The rest of the Superior Four are brought to Earth-8969 where neither of them want to follow Supreme Octopus. Despite what the Superior do, they are unable to beat Supreme Octopus. Hulk of Earth-8816, Ghost Rider of Earth-1666, and Wolverine of Earth-9712 turn against Doctor Octopus and help Supreme Octopus to rip off Doctor Octopus' tentacles. Doctor Octopus is then locked up with a skeleton and carnivorous plants in Supreme Octopus' mobile base called the Supreme Sanctorum.

There is a brief history of the creation of a Man-Thing with tentacles that end with the heads of carnivorous plants. In his cell on Earth-8969, Doctor Octopus is confronted by a tentacled Man-Thing who frees Doctor Octopus. He figures out that this Man-Thing is a variation of himself. Meanwhile, Supreme Octopus shares some of his history with Hulk of Earth-8816, Ghost Rider of Earth-1666, and Wolverine of Earth-9712 claiming that an army of Ocks is both a success and a failure. He reveals that his real name is Otto Werner von Strange and that he is the last and remaining variant of a long and tireless war. Having maintained a Multiversal balance, Supreme Octopus is in need of an heir or some heirs as he has stopped a Doctor Octopus while having obtained an army of Ocks. Meanwhile, Doctor Octopus tries to get his Man-Thing counterpart to help him as the Man-Thing bonds to him and serves as his guide through the Sanctum Supreme. Supreme Octopus explains that every Doctor Octopus variant has tried to ruin what he has built. Supreme Octopus has Hulk of Earth-8816, Ghost Rider of Earth-1666, and Wolverine of Earth-9712 see the Multiverse as it is like how a version of Doctor Octopus from Earth-7214 is an Atlantean whose kingdom Supreme Octopus sunk to keep his bio-weapon from being complete as well as their flaws. As Supreme Octopus uses his magic to restrain Hulk of Earth-8816, Ghost Rider of Earth-1666, and Wolverine of Earth-9712 so that their worlds can be reset, Doctor Octopus and Man-Thing arrive as Supreme Octopus states that he done the impossible while claiming that he can remake him into the Superior Spider-Man. He stated that he was the one who whispered in Doctor Octopus' ears on how to summon Mephisto and that he can grant him his Superior Spider-Man life back. As Doctor Octopus restrains Supreme Octopus, he explains that his Man-Thing counterpart traveled the Multiverse and freed him from his cell. Supreme Octopus summons his armor. Hulk of Earth-8816 breaks free as he is advised by Ghost Rider of Earth-1666 and Wolverine of Earth-9712 to force Supreme Octopus to send them home. They break free and help Doctor Octopus into knocking out Octopus Supreme. The Man-Thing variant then detaches from Doctor Octopus as it is introduced by Doctor Octopus as the source of his paradox. Using Supreme Octopus' body, the Man-Thing variant opens a portal back to Earth-616. Back in the Baxter Building, Doctor Octopus heads off to build himself a new set of tentacles while Hulk of Earth-8816 beings to work on rebuilding the portal. Using a translation device, the Man-Thing variant wants its agreement honored. When the rest of the Superior Four ask what agreement it is talking about, Doctor Octopus states that it wants to euthanized naturally so that it would sever the paradoxes. After building another set of arms, Doctor Octopus enters the rebuilt portal to euthanize the Man-Thing variant alone. Once that was done and having noted to himself that Supreme Octopus would one day seek revenge on him, Doctor Octopus returns to Earth-616 and makes a counter-offer with the Superior Four by stating that they can rid New York City of crime better than the police and the superheroes where he gives Hulk of Earth-8816 a special pill to devolve his Hulk form, travel to Hell with Ghost Rider of Earth-1666 and retrieve his soul while finding out what happened to Doctor Octopus' mind, and arrange for Wolverine of Earth-9712 to be a citizen on Krakoa. The Superior Four are seen attacking a smuggling operation involving Savage Land biotech. On Earth-2902, it was discovered that Doctor Octopus actually released the Man-Thing variant in Fresh Frond City as it starts to evolve into a form similar to Spider-Ock as the civilians mistake him for Spider-Ock in a new look.

Spider-Woman
After her longtime friend and former fellow private investigator Lindsay McCabe is hurt, Spider-Woman fights the Thunderbolts agents and Thunderbolts members Coachwhip and Puff Adder. Despite having a broken arm, Spider-Woman fights them off to get Lindsay to safety. Later, a Thunderbolts agent visits Lindsay McCabe's hospital room in order to get the details on who attacked her. This turns out to be Jessica Drew in disguise as she tells the doctors to take care of her. Spider-Woman then interrogates the captive Thunderbolts agent whose outfit she borrowed. He claims that Lindsay was like that when they found her as Spider-Woman prepares to use her broken arm to attack. At Gracie Mansion, Mayor Wilson Fisk is given a status update before Spider-Woman arrives. Both of them engage each other in a fight. He states that someone else has been dealing with her. In a flashback to Ravencroft, Mayor Fisk visits a cell to find out about Spider-Man. As the Thunderbolts agents arrive, Spider-Woman figures out who Mayor Fisk is talking about as Spider-Woman claims that she's supposed to be dead. Mayor Fisk states that Norman Osborn kept his "trophy" where Mayor Fisk provided a storage place. Spider-Woman then flees the area. The captive Thunderbolts unit member then breaks free from the ropes and is revealed to be a thought-to-be-dead Veranke. In the form of Spider-Woman, Veranke visits Linda Carter wanting to see her "child" Gerry.

Gerry figures out that the Jessica Drew at the door isn't her real mother as Linda Carter also asks about the cast that she is supposed to be wearing. Spider-Woman catches up to Veranke as a Thunderbolts unit truck escapes with Gerry. Spider-Woman instructs Linda to help Lindsay. As Veranke still has the same powers as Spider-Woman, she has become out of practice due to how long she was locked up by Norman Osborn after using her death as a cover-up. When Spider-Woman catches up to the Thunderbolts unit truck, Iron Man shows up to help only for Spider-Woman to see that it is Veranke in disguise. After Gerry escaped, Spider-Woman encounters the real Carol Danvers and Spider-Man with Gerry identifying the imposter Danvers. Spider-Woman uses a point blank venom blast in Veranke's face as she advises Carol to lock her up somewhere on the garbage scow. At the hospital, Jessica apologizes to Lindsay about what happened. Somewhere across the street, a sniper named Mr. O'Nay informs Octavia Vermis that he has Spider-Woman in his sight. Vermis instructs Mr. O'Nay not to attack Jessica after having found out about her fight with Veranke. She wants to give Spider-Woman a break before she can attack with her group called the Anti-Arach9 that also consists of Aeturnum, Rose Roché, and the Los Espadas Gemelas De Toledo.

Devil's Reign: Villains for Hire
At a MET Gala, the Humanity Liberation Front attacks in retaliation for what is happening with the world. Just then, Thunderbolts members Agony, Electro II, Rhino, Taskmaster, and Whiplash arrive where they defeat the Humanity Liberation Front. Later at the police department, the Thunderbolts members get impatient waiting for their next assignment. They get into a fight with each other until Mayor Wilson Fisk arrives to break it up. He sends them to find the person responsible for the attack on the gala where the suspect is hiding somewhere in Gowanus. The Thunderbolts raid a warehouse where some of its members are hiding and badly defeat them as the culprit claims that the law has gone soft back when J. Jonah Jameson was the Mayor of New York City. Afterwards, the Thunderbolts are in Mayor Fisk's office as U.S. Agent shows up stating that he reporting for duty.

Mayor Wilson Fisk sends the Thunderbolts out of his office as U.S. Agent informs him that he wants to be part of the Thunderbolts to keep its members in line while claiming "I don't walk the line. I don't cross the line. I am the line". When the Thunderbolts attack jewelry store robbers in animal masks, some of them are killed or badly beaten up until U.S. Agent arrives stating that he is now in charge of them as he beats up Electro II, Rhino, Taskmaster, and Whiplash to serve as his only warning to them. Then he confronts Agony who is suspicious of him. While in the alley, U.S. Agent is revealed to be secretly working with the FBI to find anything incriminating on Mayor Fisk. At Mayor Fisk's rally, U.S. Agent and the Thunderbolts deal with a mind-controlled crowd. As Agony advises Mayor Fisk to leave before the crowd attacks him, Mayor Fisk notices that the crowd has changed. The culprit is one of the Purple Children as Electro II gets mind-controlled. As a lot of people are shocked, Rhino subdues Electro II as anyone not mind-controlled films the incident.

U.S. Agent advises the Thunderbolts to get Electro II away from the area before she goes nuclear. Mayor Wilson Fisk is loaded into his limo as he advises U.S. Agent to keep the Thunderbolts in line and clean up the mess. U.S. Agent and Agony encounter the culprit called Conviction who claimed that Mayor Fisk kept her trapped in Ravencroft trying to reproduce the Purple Children's power. After a brief scuffle where Conviction got away, U.S. Agent and Agony meet up with Mayor Fisk and the rest of the Thunderbolts to mention about their encounter with Conviction. Mayor Fisk then assigns them to find the Purple Children as James Wesley gives them trackers. As Rhino doesn't want to hunt children, Mayor Fisk brings in Abomination as his replacement and mind-controls U.S. Agent to oversee the assignment as the Thunderbolts hunt down the Purple Children. When they are found, they are confronted by Jessica Jones and the Champions.

Devil's Reign: X-Men
In the past, Kingpin has killed some men in the shower as he instructs James Wesley to send Elektra as the person he wants dead is out for Emma Frost. At a nightclub, Emma Frost mind-controls her way to Mr. Loufex to speak about their mutual friend Kingpin. In the present at Seneca Park, U.S. Agent and the Thunderbolts agents are outside the New York hideout of the X-Men as Rogue contacts all points about who's at their door as U.S. Agent demands the X-Men's surrender. As Emma Frost goes to the United Nations building, U.S. Agent is met with resistance from Polaris. Mayor Fisk is informed of the situation with the X-Men and their diplomatic immunity. Cyclops in his Captain Krakoa attire, Jean Grey, Rogue, Synch, and Wolverine prepare to head to give up the Seneca Gardens and face the music. Captain Krakoa, Jean Grey, and Rogue state to U.S. Agent that they aren't going to fight them in front of the cameras. Just then, Thunderbolts members Agony, Electro II, Rhino, and Taskmaster arrive as backup for U.S. Agent where Electro II shocks Polaris when U.S. Agent asks which way his shield went. As Rogue asks Rhino what Gambit would think of him working for Mayor Fisk, Jean Grey stops Polaris from retaliating against Electro II as Taskmaster offends Wolverine by calling her a pretender. Jean Grey then speaks to U.S. Agent who wants to report the X-Men's "illegal structure" to the Parks Department. Just then, Emma Frost shows up with an order from the U.N. to not violate a structure from Krakoa. Wesley informs Mayor Fisk on what U.S. Agent informed him as he tells Wesley to send a message to the Thunderbolts to leave the X-Men to him. U.S. Agent withdraws the Thunderbolts from Seneca Park. Mayor Fisk has Wesley summon the chief of detectives about a murder of a young woman where they can implicate a "rich and powerful woman of privilege".

A news bulletin states that Emma Frost has been connected with a cold case murder. At the law offices of Harris, Oppenheim & Gallagher, Emma Frost is told by her lawyers that the case against her isn't great as Emma states that she has never committed child abuse. Emma Frost then takes the time to recap on using an illusion of Invisible Woman, having a drink with Tony Stark, sending a telepathic message to She-Hulk that her client is guilty, and a visit to Nick Fury. She plans to settle the case. Years ago at the Hellfire Club, Emma Frost is visited by Elektra who needs help with a witness to one of Elektra's missions. She takes Emma Frost to the witnesses apartment. In the next apartment over, some criminals are attacked by a black-suited Spider-Man. Emma Frost evacuates the witness Isabelle as Elektra and Spider-Man fight the criminals. After reading Spider-Man's mind, Emma Frost advises him to help Elektra. Loading Isabelle into her limousine, Kingpin's men take some pictures as the newspaper states "Frost's Cold Case? Missing Girl Last Seen Alive With White Queen". In London, Emma Frost brainwashes some police officer into going for a swim in the river. She gets ambushed by Union Jack who plans to have her extradited back to New York City while asking if she did kill an orphan.

As Union Jack hands Emma Frost over the police, she turns the tide against them by throwing the power-dampener collar on a police officer and having two dogs attack Union Jack. She proceeds to break free and make the police officers spar with each other. After Emma Frost releases the dogs and makes her way underground, Union Jack tells the police officers that he knows where she is heading. Emma Frost arrives at the London Hellfire Club where she meets up with Isabelle. After learning from Emma Frost on why she can't mind-wipe Mayor Wilson Fisk, Isabelle mentioned that Elektra trained her in some combat skills before disappearing. Union Jack then raids the building with a SWAT Team as Isabelle starts fighting Union Jack. Isabelle then stabs a SWAT officer in the leg as she meets up with Emma Frost in the basement. Moments later, Emma Frost and Isabelle arrive on Krakoa. After a spa day, Emma Frost meets up with Ben Urich where the Daily Bugle prints out an article stating "Mayor smears Frost". Mayor Fisk states to the press that Isabelle is alive and well. At the offices of Harris, Oppenheim & Gallagher, Emma is informed that she still has arrest warrants in country's that don't recoginize the Krakoa amnesty deal until further notice. She instructs them to have the finance team slowly and quietly buying stock in the insurance company. Then Emma mind-controls Typhoid Mary when she confronts Mayor Fisk where she claims that his life will come crashing down one day. She then takes her leave stating that Typhoid Mary will awaken with no memory of this encounter.

Devil's Reign: Winter Soldier
Mayor Wilson Fisk is informed by James Wesley that Gracie Mansion is secured and Typhoid Mary is away. He has been having sleepless nights since the new law has passed. Winter Soldier infiltrates Gracie Mansion to steal some files when he is confronted by Mayor Fisk. As Mayor Fisk goes on the attack, Winter Soldier works to dodge his attacks while holding his file. As Gracie Mansion is partially-collapsed, James Wesley returns with the NYPD and finds Mayor Fisk near the rubble stating that he had a wonderful dream. After burning some files, a wounded Winter Soldier makes his way to an alley with his own file. Now that he has a purpose, Winter Soldier vows that whoever wrote this file won't survive the year and states that he'll "sleep when they're dead".

Moon Knight
In light of Moon Knight getting arrested by the Thunderbolts, Dr. Badr meets with the Moonlight Mission where he substitutes as "Doctor Moon". He and Mr. Flint find that several people were slain by crossbows which leads them to suspect that Stained Glass Scarlet is responsible. While it was claimed that Stained Glass Scarlet was dead and that someone might've inherited her legacy. Reaching the church in the South Bronx where Stained Glass Scarlet was supposedly killed, Doctor Moon encounters Stained Glass Scarlet who claims that she is reborn as she goes on the attack. After a brief fight, Doctor Moon manages to get away. Back at the Midnight Mission, Dr. Badr informs Reese about these recent events. At Ravencroft, it is discovered that a patient is not in their cell as a guard tells his co-worker that the inmate is an ex-Hydra assassin/terrorist with a four digit count and nearly turned Taipei into glass before his' defeat. Knowing the description of the inmate, the guard initiates a red alert that states that Rutherford Winner is on the loose.

Devil's Reign: Spider-Man
At the police department, Marcus Momplaiser of Beyond Corporation has been informed by Commissioner Kyle that Spider-Man has been sprung from their custody by Human Torch and Thing. After being sprung out by Human Torch and Thing, Ben Reilly as Spider-Man is ambushed by a Thunderbolts agent who places a power dampener collar on him in order to easily transport him to the Myrmidon. After breaking out of the transport, Ben contacts Janine Godbe while Marcus Momplaiser has been ambushed by Richard Fisk in his Rose alias. Rose is confronted by two Thunderbolts agents who state that Spider-Man got away. After driving away the Thunderbolts agents, Rose goes to Plan B and prepares to torture his Marcus. Maxine Danger comes in where he tells Ben Reilly that the weapon he recovered from the Thunderbolts agents was stolen S.H.I.E.L.D. technology. After being told about Rose, Ben is approached by Misty Knight and Colleen Wing who state that Rose has been selling the stolen S.H.I.E.L.D. technology on the streets and that Marcus Momplaiser has been abducted. Rose has been unable to get any useful information out of Marcus and will still have a use for him. Becoming Spider-Man, Ben Reilly finds the Thunderbolts agents arresting someone dressed as Spider-Man. Spider-Man defeats the Thunderbolts agents and finds out that Marcus was dressed as Spider-Man as he advises Spider-Man to get away. Just then, Rose appears with the same S.H.I.E.L.D. weapon and attacks Spider-Man where he reveals that he spiked Marcus' Spider-Man costume with electrodes which he uses to shock them. Before Rose can finish of Spider-Man, Marcus uses one of the Thunderbolts agents electric sticks which helps him to knock out Rose. Back at Beyond Tower, a recuperating Ben is visited by Marcus who advises him to take the time to recuperate. The Thunderbolts agents bring to the NYPD someone in a Spider-Man outfit. He is unmasked by Commissioner Kyle to be a gagged Rose with the words "Here's Johnny" on the tape that's over his mouth.

Devil's Reign: Moon Knight
At the Myrmidon, 8-Ball is in his cell mentioning on how he has fought Moon Knight, She-Hulk, Sleepwalker, and Spider-Man and also recalls how he died and was revived by Hood. This information he reveals to his cellmate. In the cafeteria, 8-Ball is unable to get a seat with the Wrecking Crew, the Enforcers, and the Death-Throws. When sitting at a table alone, he is confronted by one inmates. He causes 8-Ball some trouble before being fended off by 8-Ball's cellmate who gives a statement that causes the inmate to run. 8-Ball figures out that his cellmate is Moon Knight who is not sitting with his fellow incarcerated superheroes. Moon Knight is informed by 8-Ball that Man Mountain Marko is the "king of the cage". Moon Knight then attacks the inmates that he had engraved the moon icon on and advises them to remind him later what names they went by. Later on, Moon Knight is grabbed by a Thunderbolts agent who drags him to the showers. He is thrown in and confronted by the inmates. When the Thunderbolts agent opens the door, Moon Knight comes out having defeated the inmates and that he wants a shot at the title. His first bout is against Boomslang who he defeats. Bout #3 shows his victory against Mr. Fish. Bout #5 has him victorious against Killer Shrike and Cactus. Bout #6 is against Massacre where Moon Knight is victorious. Then it comes to the title match in Bout #7 against Man Mountain Marko. When Man Mountain Marko asks if Moon Knight is ready to die, Moon Knight stated that Raoul Bushman did that first. Man Mountain Marko gives Moon Knight a hard time as Moon Knight recalls his Mr. Knight alias meeting Man Mountain Marko's ex-wife Judith Cort and how their daughter has started taking after her father powers and all. After that flashback while not wanting Man Mountain Marko to go after his daughter, Moon Knight beats Man Mountain Marko into surrender as he advises him not to go after his ex-wife or his daughter if he gets out as he won't see them again. Moon Knight proceeds to induce blindness on Man Mountain Marko as the Thunderbolts agents come in. After an altercation, Moon Knight is placed in solitary confinement in chains as 8-Ball mops up outside his cell. Moon Knight states that the incarcerated superheroes will go after Mayor Wilson Fisk when they get out.

Aftermath
Mister Fantastic has been tracking the travels of Kingpin and Typhoid Mary with their latest stop being in Latveria which he mentions to Daredevil. As Daredevil states that they got to find him and make him pay for what he's done, Mister Fantastic states that he will pick up the search tomorrow as he has to prepare for "Matt Murdock's funeral". The Thing, Foggy Nelson, J. Jonah Jameson, Mayor Luke Cage, Jessica Jones, Danny Rand and Danielle Cage are in attendance. After the funeral, Jameson talks to Nelson who he has recorded the funeral for his podcast.  Jones meets Ben Hochberg who states that he will be working with Mayor Cage. Their discussion is interrupted when Cage gets angered at Butch Pharris showing up to pay his respects. While Rand keeps them from getting into a fight, Butch mentions that it was his father who killed "Matt". Butch tells Foggy that the man in the casket is actually Mike and that he was pretending to be Matt as a favor. After Butch leaves, Cage and Rand confront Daredevil and Elektra on a rooftop for Matt's callousness towards Mike's death.  Daredevil explains that he wants the world to think that Matt Murdock is dead and that Mike never had many friends growing up; he and Elektra are going to use that opportunity destroy the Hand. Their discussion is interrupted by some bank robbers as they head out and defeat them. The Thunderbolts units arrive as Mayor Cage is surprised that they are still operating after what Kingpin made them do. A Thunderbolts agent informs Cage that they don't work for him as vigilantism is still illegal in New York City. Jones and Danielle visit Joseph at an orphanage where Jones removes his power dampening collar. She brings Joseph to her and Luke's home as Luke finishes a call with his legal expert Harris about a repeal of the vigilantism ban as they would have to convince the councilors. At the cemetery, Kristin has a final moment with "Matt" as he places the stone that was found on him at the time of his death in the casket. What Kristin doesn't know is that the stone in question is a Norn Stone. Mayor Cage later meets with Spectrum as they tie up the loose end with Kingpin's Thunderbolts as they take down Crossbones and the Thunderbolts agents with him. Upon defeating them, Mayor Cage and Spectrum are approached by the press and a public relations specialist named Helen Astrantia who has been tasked with re-framing the Thunderbolts brand in a positive way with Spectrum leading them. As Spectrum doesn't want the job and flies off, Helen suggests Clint Barton since Dane Whitman, Sam Wilson, Barbra Morse, and Jane van Dyne don't want the job either. The next morning, Mayor Cage has his first press conference where there are some Fisk supporters present as the police work to keep the crowd in line. Mayor Cage does some workouts while recalling his history and taking down Taskmaster and Whiplash. After his workout, Mayor Cage begins his press conference where he states that he will work to restore order in New York City.

Issues involved

Main series

Tie-in issues

Reception

Collected Editions

References

Comics set in New York City
Daredevil (Marvel Comics) storylines